Natanael Siringoringo (born 18 September 1999) is an Indonesian professional footballer who plays as a winger for Indonesian Liga 1 club Dewa United, on loan from Kelantan.

Having played futsal prior to his footballing career, Siringoringo began his career by joining local club PSMS Medan in 2019. A year later he went to sign for Sulut United. In 2021, Siringoringo went abroad to Malaysia, joining Kelantan in the Malaysia Premier League. In 2022, He returned to Indonesia by joining Dewa United on a loan deal, where he would mark his top flight debut in the same year.

Club career

Early career
Siringoringo started his career by playing futsal. with SDR FC Binjai, he has competed in the 2018 Indonesian Pro Futsal League.

PSMS Medan
In 2019, Siringoringo signed his first professional contract for Indonesian Liga 2 club, PSMS Medan. At the age of 19, Siringoringo made his professional debut on 6 July 2019, during a 3–2 league victory over Perserang Serang. On 1 August 2019, Siringoringo scored his first professional goal in the Derby Sumatera against Sriwijaya. He scored the goal in the 25th minute from a header, upon receiving a cross from Rendi Saputra. the final match score was 1–1.

Sulut United
In 2020, Siringoringo signed for Sulut United. due to the COVID-19 pandemic the 2020 Liga 2 season was cancelled. Siringoringo would left the club in 2021, without making a single appearance.

Kelantan
On 12 February 2021, it was confirmed that Siringoringo had signed for Malaysia Premier League club Kelantan. It was revealed that he has signed a three-year contract.

2021 season
On 9 March, Siringoringo made his debut, by coming on as a substitute during a 2–1 league win against FAM-MSN Project. He also assisted the second goal. Four-days later, on 13 March, Siringoringo made his first start and assisted against PDRM as his team won 2–1. Siringoringo scored his first goal for The Red Warriors on 10 April, during a league match against Kuching City. On 27 September, Siringoringo started against Malaysia Super League giants Johor Darul Ta'zim in the Malaysia Cup. The match result was a defeat with a score of 2–0. On 11 August, Siringoringo scored two-goals in Derby Kelantan against Kelantan United, helping his team win 3–1. On 30 September he scored a goal in a 2–2 draw against Sabah in the Malaysia Cup.

2022 season
On 5 March, Siringoringo netted his first goal of the season during a 2–1 victory against Johor Darul Ta'zim II in the league match opener.

Loan to Dewa United
On 9 June 2022, Kelantan announced a loan move of Siringoringo to Indonesian club Dewa United. It was reported both parties has agreed to pay transfer loan fee by Dewa United. Siringoringo was loaned for the first half of the 2022–23 Liga 1 season. He finally made his debut on 24 June, in the 2022 Indonesia President's Cup against Persis Solo as his team drew 1–1.
On 25 July, Siringoringo made his league debut and scored the winning goal in a 3–2 victory against Persis. 

On 14 January 2022, Siringoringo scored in 84th minute and saved Dewa United from losing to Persis Solo, score draw 1–1.

International career
Siringoringo made his debut for Indonesia U23, on 22 October 2021, by starting in a 2–0 win against Nepal U23.

Career statistics

Club

References

External links

Natanael Siringoringo at TRW Kelantan FC

Living people
1999 births
Sportspeople from Medan
Sportspeople from North Sumatra
Indonesian footballers
Association football wingers
Indonesia youth international footballers
PSMS Medan players
Kelantan F.C. players
Dewa United F.C. players
Liga 2 (Indonesia) players
Malaysia Premier League players
Liga 1 (Indonesia) players
Indonesian expatriate footballers
Indonesian expatriate sportspeople in Malaysia
Expatriate footballers in Malaysia